Sheila Chin (陳淑蘭, Pinyin: Chen Shulan) is a Hong Kong actress.

She was elected First Runner-Up and Miss Photogenic at the 1988 Miss Hong Kong Pageant.

Filmography
 All's Well, Ends Well 2009 (2009)
 Love is not All Around (2007)
 Forever Yours (2004)
 Magic Kitchen (2004) - Yau's Mom
 Visible Secret 2 (2002)
 Funeral March (2001) - Elsa
 Thanks for Your Love (1996) - Nancy
 The Day That Doesn't Exist (1995) - Poon Ka-Sze
 Because of Lies (1995) - Siu B's Girlfriend
 He & She (1994) - Chi-Kai's Sister-in-Law
 Whatever You Want (1994) - Julianna
 Kick Boxer (1993) - Jane
 Heroes Among Heroes (1993) - Aunt Jean
 The Inspector Wears Skirts 4 (1992) - Lou
 Lady Hunter (1992) - Blackie
 All's Well, Ends Well (1992) - Sheila
 Her Fatal Ways (1991) - Hsuen Pi
 Doctor Vampire (1991) - May Chen
 Bullet for Hire (1991) - Lan
 All for the Winner (1990) - Ying
 The Outlaw Brothers (1990) - Lan
 Prince of the Sun (1990) - Wan May-Ngor
 Stars and Roses (1989)

TV series 
 Dr Vampire (1990)
 Conscience (1994)
 FM 701 (2003)

TV show anchor 
 The Funny Half Show

References

External links
 

Hong Kong film actresses
Living people
1969 births
20th-century Hong Kong actresses
21st-century Hong Kong actresses
Hong Kong television actresses
Hong Kong radio presenters
Hong Kong women radio presenters
Hong Kong television presenters
Hong Kong women television presenters